Hello Jadoo is a South Korean comic published by cartoonist Lee Bin in "Monthly PARTY" in September 1997. Tooniverse (CJ E&M broadcasting business division) and Atoonz co-produced an animation series under the same name in 2011, 2012, 2015, and 2017. The background is set to Heukseok-dong, Dongjak-gu, Seoul, South Korea.

On June 12, 2019, more than 31 books were published, along with a supplementary comics titled Mom is Best Friend. In early 2010, a four-episode animation called Hello Jadoo: Mom is Best Friend aired on Tooniverse, but it was not aired on SBS.

Broadcast Time

Plot
The story is set in Seoul, South Korea in the 1980s and the 2000s, telling a pleasant and heartwarming story of Ja-doo and people around her.

Characters

Main characters
Choi Ja-doo (최자두)
Voice actor: Yeo Min-jeong
The protagonist of the series, Ja-doo is an outgoing and tomboyish 10-year-old girl who often causes troubles. She is the oldest of all 3 siblings.

Lee Nan-hyang (이난향)
Voice actor: Yang Jeong-hwa
Nan-hyang is Ja-doo's irascible mother who always scolds Ja-doo for being a troublemaker.

Choi Ho-dol (최호돌)
Voice actor: Choi Joon-young
A North Korean refugee from Pyongyang, Ho-dol is Ja-doo's father who works as a manager. Whenever Ho-dol receives his salary, he spends it mostly on drinking and gets drunk when he comes home, causing Nan-hyang to be angry. 

Choi Mimi (최미미)
Voice actor: Jeong Yu-mi
Mimi is Ja-doo's 8-year-old younger sister and the middle child of the family.

Choi Seung-ki (최승기)
Voice actor: Kim Hyun-ji
Seung-ki is Ja-doo's 5-year-old younger brother. He is the frequent victim of Ja-doo's antics, who often steals money from his allowance savings.

Supporting characters
Kim Min-ji (김민지)
Voice actor: Jeong Hye-ok
Nicknamed "Cicada", Min-ji is Ja-doo's outgoing best friend who is the top student in class. She is outgoing, yet aggressive towards Ja-doo initially, but warms up to her in later stories. Min-ji dreams to be a scientist when she grows older.

Lee Yoon-seok
Voice actor: Kim Young-eun
Yoon-seok is the class president who is mischievous. He tried to confess himself to Jadoo multiple times, but failed due to a misunderstanding.

Jang Seong-hoon
Voice actor: Jeong Hye-won
Seong-hoon is one of Jadoo's classmates who was born as an only child to a wealthy family. He is not athletic and often tries to skip Physical Education classes. Although Seong-hoon was afraid of Jadoo at first, he fell in love with her due to her cute looks. He has a snail given to him by Ja-doo.

Kim Seon-dol "Dol-dol"
Voice actor: Jeong Yu-mi
Nicknamed "Dol-dol", Seon-dol is one of Ja-doo's classmates who is modeled on the writer's husband, Jeon Ho-jin. Like Seong-hoon, he comes from a wealthy family, as his father works as a CEO.

Lee Eun-hee
Voice actor: Kim Sae-hae
Eun-hee is one of Ja-doo's classmates who likes to be the center of attention and always mocks other students. She has a crush on Soon-gi and dreams of becoming a singer.

Yoon Soon-gi "Ddal-gi"
Voice actor: Kim Bo-yeong
 Nicknamed "Ddal-gi"(meaning strawberry in Korean; because the shape of his face looks like a strawberry), Soon-gi is one of Ja-doo's classmates whose parents manage a bakery, as stated in Season 3.

Lee Mi-ja
Voice actor: Kim Bo-yeong
Mi-ja is Ja-doo's homeroom teacher. She sometimes scolds her, but the other children admire her attitude.

Books

Awards 

 2004 Today's Our Comics Award
 2009 Korea Contents Awards Excellence Award in Comics
 2010 Korea Content Grand Prize, Popular Animation Special Award
 2013 Korea Content Awards, Animation Category Minister of Culture and Tourism Award
 2016 Korea Content Awards, Animation Category Minister of Culture and Sports Award
 2010, 2013, 2016 1st Best Contents by The Ministry of Culture and Tourism
 2010 4th CableTV Awards Best Picture of the Year Award on the education/children’s section

References

External links 

Hello Jadoo Official Channel.
SBS Hello Jadoo Homepage.

2011 anime television series debuts
2012 anime television series debuts
2015 anime television series debuts
2017 anime television series debuts
1997 comics debuts
1997 establishments in South Korea
South Korean animated television series
South Korean children's animated television series
Tooniverse original programming